Sant'Apollinare may refer to :

Sant'Apollinare, a comune in the province of Frosinone, Italy
Sant'Apollinare, a frazione of Rovigo, Italy
Sant'Apollinare, a frazione of Arcevia, Italy
Sant'Apollinare di Vito, a frazione of Reggio Calabria, Italy
Sant'Apollinare, a frazione of San Vito Chietino, Italy
Sant'Apollinare, an island of the Brissago Islands
Basilica of Sant'Apollinare in Classe, a church in Ravenna
Basilica of Sant'Apollinare Nuovo, a church in Ravenna
Sant'Apollinare alle Terme Neroniane-Alessandrine, a church in Rome